Joseph Commey (born 5 May 2003) is a Ghanaian boxer. He represented Ghana at the 2022 Commonwealth Games.

On 3 August 2022, Commey defeated Alex Mukuka of Namibia to progress to the semifinals and automatically guaranteed Ghana its first bronze medal at the 2022 Commonwealth Games if he lost the semi-final bout. Commey went on to win his semi final match against India's Hassam Uddin Mohammed to make it to the finals against Jude Gallagher of Northern Ireland of which Gallagher won by a walkover due to Commey falling ill and declared unfit to box. He is a product of the Black Panthers Boxing Club in Accra headed by Ebenezer Adjei. Joseph Commey is a junior brother of John Commey, a very promising boxing star who passed away after short illness on Saturday August 22, 2020. Prior to the Commonwealth Games 2022 in Birmingham, Commey has never lost a fight in his amateur boxing career.

References

External links 

 

2003 births
Living people
Ghanaian male boxers
Featherweight boxers
Boxers from Accra
Boxers at the 2022 Commonwealth Games
21st-century Ghanaian people
Commonwealth Games silver medallists for Ghana
Commonwealth Games medallists in boxing
Medallists at the 2022 Commonwealth Games